Huang's World is a 2016 American television documentary series hosted by Eddie Huang.  The series premiered on 28 April 2016 on Viceland,a multinational brand of television channel owned by Vice Media.  The series focuses on the concept of "exploring identity using food as an equalizer," as Huang travels around the world and experiences local culture and politics.

Development

Series overview

Episodes

Season 1

Season 2

External links
Viceland official website
Eddie Huang's Net Worth
Eddie Huang's Interview

References

2016 web series debuts
2010s American documentary television series
2016 American television series debuts
Viceland original programming